Morton Ranch High School is a secondary school in the Katy Independent School District.  It opened in 2004, and is located in unincorporated Harris County, Texas, United States. It is part of a multi-school complex, including Morton Ranch Elementary that opened in 2008 and Morton Ranch Junior High School that opened in 2003. The school serves many northern sections of Katy I.S.D., and has grades 9 through 12. The mascot is a Maverick.

History
In 2012 the nonprofit Children at Risk categorized Morton Ranch as an "urban school" for the first time, since the school had a low income population exceeding 50%. That year it ranked Morton Ranch as the best "urban" comprehensive high school in the Houston area.

Demographics
In 2012 there were 3,050 students. 36% of the students were Hispanic or Latino, 39% were white, 18% were black, and 5% were Asian.

Academic performance
The school's passing rate for the Texas Assessment of Knowledge and Skills (TAKS) language arts test for 11th graders was 98% as of 2012. The Class of 2010 four year graduation rate was 90%.

Campus
Morton Ranch High School is a modified repeat design based on the award-winning Cinco Ranch High School plan. The major differences between Morton Ranch High School and Cinco Ranch High School are in the size of the science labs, the weight room, and the addition of a third gym at the east end of the building.

Specific detail changes requested by the end users have been incorporated to make a great plan even better. Also, the exterior of the building was changed to give it a different character. Morton Ranch also has a large library, located off the rotunda in the west wing of the school. Morton Ranch High School includes a Performing Arts Center that was master-planned during the original construction.

Additions

For the growth that outdid Katy Independent School District predictions, a new bond was passed. The bond included a new Ninth Grade Center for Morton Ranch High School, that was completed for the 2008–2009 school year.

Originally, the 9th Grade Center at Morton Ranch High School was scheduled to be complete in time for the 2007–2008 school year, but a failed bond pushed the project back one year.

Athletics
Since the 2006–2007 school year, Morton Ranch High School has been entered as a school. It now plays several 6A Varsity sports including:
Basketball
Tennis
Football
Golf
Soccer
Wrestling
Baseball
Softball
Volleyball
Track and Field
Cross Country
Swimming
Bowling

Feeder patterns
The following elementary schools feed into Morton Ranch High School:

 Franz Elementary
 Golbow Elementary
 Sundown Elementary
 Winborn Elementary
 King Elementary (partial)
 McRoberts Elementary (partial)
 Stephens Elementary (partial)
 Morton Ranch Elementary (partial)

The following junior high schools feed into Morton Ranch High School:

 Katy Junior High (partial)
 McDonald Junior High (partial)
 Morton Ranch Junior High

Notable alumni
Kevin Foster (Class of 2008) – college basketball standout at Santa Clara University who finished as the school's all-time leading scorer with 2,423 points
Tamyra Mensah-Stock (Class of 2011) - women's wrestling 2018 68 kg world bronze medalist and 2019 68 kg world champion. Olympic Gold Medalist at the 2020 Tokyo Olympics in the 68kg Freestyle
Danielle Hunter (Class of 2012) - NFL defensive end for the Minnesota Vikings, former LSU standout.
Elijah Hall (Class of 2013) - Sprinter (60M,200M,4X1,4X2) for USA TRACK, UOFH TRACK.

References

External links

Morton Ranch High School Athletic Booster Club

Educational institutions established in 2004
Public high schools in Harris County, Texas
2004 establishments in Texas
Katy Independent School District high schools